The Battle of Twthill took place at Caernarfon in North Wales on 2 November 1401 during the revolt of Owain Glyndŵr. Glyndŵr's success at the Battle of Mynydd Hyddgen the previous June had provided the revolt with fresh impetus, and the battle may be seen as indicative of his determination to foster revolt in the north-west after months of relative inaction in that area. In symbolic terms, the battle is most famous as the first occasion on which Glyndŵr flew his flag bearing a golden dragon on a white field, recalling the symbolism of Uther Pendragon, and thereby more solidly drawing comparisons between his revolt and Welsh political mythology of the time, which drew heavily on the image of the mab darogan or chosen son, who would free Wales from subjugation.

Little is known about the particulars of the fighting; the battle ended inconclusively, with 300 Welsh soldiers reported dead, but the isolation of Caernarfon and Glyndŵr's ability to attack English positions in Wales with impunity was amply demonstrated.

References

Battles involving Wales
15th century in Wales
Conflicts in 1401
1401 in Wales
Glyndŵr Rising